The blunt-headed salamander (Ambystoma amblycephalum) is a mole salamander endemic to Mexico. It is only known from the vicinity of its type locality, near Morelia, in Michoacán state in Southwestern Mexico. It inhabits a landscape consisting of a mosaic of natural grasslands and pine-oak forests at elevations of about  asl. Breeding takes place in ponds.

It has both neotenic and terrestrial populations. Neotenic populations are perennibranchiate and retain their fins. Neotenes are very long with extremely short, blunt heads and round eyes. They have relatively short, thick gills. Their coloring is dark brown-gray dorsally, with a lighter gray under-belly. They have small, dark marks on their head and back.

References

Mole salamanders
Endemic amphibians of Mexico
Amphibians described in 1940